Chanel College is a Catholic co-educational college in Moamoa, Samoa. It is near the top of Mount Vaea, at the end of Moamoa Road, which leads directly from Apia. The college has been staffed by a combination of Marist Fathers, Salasian sisters, volunteer organizations and regular employees.

History
Founded in 1962 by the Marist Fathers, it was originally a boys-only boarding school (with special permission for non-boarders) that later became co-educational. The first principal was Father Bernard Doherty. The first head prefect was Lino Samoa, who later received from his family his chiefly title of "Taupa'u".

Enrollment numbers (in 2008) exceeded 400 students.

Abuse 
At least one priest who taught at Chanel College is alleged to have been a pedophile.

 Father Francis A Durning, SM, MA. In 2009, the Society of Mary (Marists) in New Zealand accepted a complaint that one of its priests, a former teacher at Chanel College (in 1975), Francis Durning, had sexually abused children. He was mentioned in the NZ Royal Commission of Inquiry into Abuse in Care hearings in Nov. 2020.

References

Educational institutions established in 1962
Schools in Samoa